The 2007–08 Boston College Eagles men's basketball team represented college basketball for Boston College during the 2007–08 NCAA Division I men's basketball season. The Eagles were led by eleventh-year head coach Al Skinner, played their home games at the Conte Forum, and were members of the Atlantic Coast Conference.

Roster

Schedule and results

|-
!colspan=9| Regular Season

|-
!colspan=9| ACC Tournament

References

Boston College
Boston College Eagles men's basketball seasons
Boston College Eagles men's basketball
Boston College Eagles men's basketball
Boston College Eagles men's basketball
Boston College Eagles men's basketball